The Battle of Chamkaur, also known as Battle of Chamkaur Sahib, was a battle fought between the Khalsa, led by Guru Gobind Singh, and the coalition forces of the Mughals led by Wazir Khan and of Hindu hill chief. Guru Gobind Singh makes a reference to this battle in his letter Zafarnama.

Preamble to the battle
After Guru Gobind Singh left Anandpur Sahib on the night of 5 and 6 December 1704, or 1705 he crossed the Sarsa river with his disciples. While they were crossing, the mughals and hill chiefs attacked. Guru Gobind Singh and his followers asked permission of the city chief for shelter to rest for the night in their garhi or haveli. He refused, but his younger brother allowed the Sikhs to stay in the haveli.

The battle
Despite giving assurance of safe conduct, the Mughal soldiers were looking for Guru Gobind Singh, to take his head as a trophy. After learning that the party of Sikhs had taken shelter in the haveli, they laid siege upon it. The actual battle is said to have taken place outside the haveli where Guru Gobind Singh was resting. Negotiations broke down and the Sikh soldiers chose to engage the overwhelming Mughal forces, thus allowing their Guru to escape. Another Sikh who resembled the Guru, Sangat Singh, donned the Guru's clothes and remained with the soldiers. The next morning the remaining Sikhs were killed by Mughal forces.

Aftermath
The Guru emphasised how he was proud that his sons had died fighting in battle, and that he had 'thousands of sons – the Singhs'. He also said that he would never trust Aurangzeb again due to the broken vow he took on the Quran.

Zafarnama
Zafarnama or "Epistle of Victory" is a letter that was written by Guru Gobind Singh to the then Mughal Emperor Aurangzeb. Zafarnama vividly describes what happened at Chamkaur, and also holds Aurangzeb responsible for what occurred and promises he broke.

After his escape from Chamkaur, the exhausted Guru is said to have been carried by two Pathans (Ghani Khan and Nabi Khan) to Jatpur where he was received by the local Muslim chieftain. He later went to Dina, and stayed at mayi Desan ji house, where he wrote "Zafarnama" in Persian, in 111 verses.

See also

References

External links
 Battle description at singhsabha.com

Conflicts in 1704
Chamkaur
1704 in India
Chamkaur